Sanamahi Temple or Sanamahi Sanglen is a temple of Lainingthou Sanamahi, the supreme deity of Sanamahism. It is located in the Sanakhwa Yaima Kollup near Kangla Palace in Imphal West district of Manipur, India. It is one of the oldest temples in Asia. However,  it is often confused with the Sanamahi Kiyong Temple,  situated in the hilltop of the Nongmaiching Hill of Imphal East district of Manipur. It is one of the largest Kanglei temples in the state.

Construction 
It was reconstructed during the reign of king Kulachandra Singh of Manipur (princely state) in 1891 AD. It is one of the oldest temples in Asia. It is built in a Gothic style for the roof.  In its southern side,  there is a flying advance. The structure is raised in an octagonal base. It is currently located in the 1st Manipur Rifles Ground at Imphal West district of Manipur.

See also 
Hiyangthang Lairembi Temple

References

External links 
 https://imphaleast.nic.in/tourist-place/sanamahi_kiyong/ Sanamahi Lainingkol
 https://www.imphaltimes.com/news/item/14454-sanamahi-kiyong-to-be-inaugurated-on-june-8 Sanamahi Kiyong
 http://www.onlytravelguide.com/manipur/spiritual/lord-sanamahi-temple.php
 https://www.aninews.in/videos/national/locals-celebrate-mera-chaorel-houba-festival-great-fervour-manipur/

Imphal West district
Sanamahism
Temples in Manipur